Irymple is a locality in Cobar Shire in New South Wales, Australia. It is located 555 kilometres away from Sydney. The nearest airport is Cobar Airport, 117 kilometres away and the nearest railway station is Euabalong West, 135 kilometres away.

Location 
Irymple is connected to the Kidman Way by a very small road that passes through Irymple's Yathong Nature Reserve and Nombinnie Nature Reserve. Nearby places include:

References

Cobar Shire
Populated places in New South Wales